Eve is a 2008 American romantic comedy short film written and directed by Natalie Portman, starring Lauren Bacall, Ben Gazzara and Olivia Thirlby. The film was produced by her production company Handsomecharlie Films and distributed by Relativity Media.

Plot
Kate (Olivia Thirlby) is a young woman visiting her grandmother (Lauren Bacall) to talk about her mother "Eve" but instead she surprisingly ends up as both chauffeur and chaperone on her grandmother's romantic dinner date with a widower named Joe (Ben Gazzara).

Cast
Lauren Bacall as Grandma
Olivia Thirlby as Kate
Ben Gazzara as Joe
Nicholas Rotundo as Maitre'D
Richard Delia as Bruce
Chris Colombo as Stunt Driver

Production
Eve was shot on location at the Firebird Restaurant in New York City.

Release
Eve premiered at the 65th Venice International Film Festival on September 1, 2008 in Venice, Italy. The film opened the festival's short film section, called "corto-cortissimo" (English: "short and shortest"), and was screened alongside 23 other films from around the world.

On October 17, 2008, Eve received its North American premiere when it was screened at the Hamptons International Film Festival in East Hampton, New York.

References

External links

2008 films
2008 short films
American short films
Films directed by Natalie Portman
Relativity Media films
Films with screenplays by Natalie Portman
Sufjan Stevens soundtracks
2000s English-language films